The city of Lexington is the county seat of Oglethorpe County, Georgia, United States. The population was 239 at the 2000 census.

Lexington is home to Shaking Rock Park.

History
Lexington was founded in 1800. That same year, the seat of Oglethorpe County was transferred to Lexington from Philomath. Lexington was incorporated as a town in 1806, and is named for Lexington, Massachusetts.

Geography
Lexington is located at  (33.870351, -83.110916). U.S. Route 78, as well as Georgia State Routes 22 and 77, all pass through the city. U.S. 78 leads southeast  to Washington and northwest  to Athens. GA-22 runs through the city concurrent with GA-22, leading north  to Comer and southeast  to Crawfordville. GA-77 leads northeast  to Elberton and south  to Union Point.

Climate

Demographics

As of the census of 2000, there were 239 people, 101 households, and 65 families residing in the city. The racial makeup of the city was 70.71% White, 25.94% African American, 0.84% Native American, and 2.51% from two or more races. Hispanic or Latino of any race were 1.26% of the population.

There were 101 households, out of which 23.8% had children under the age of 18 living with them, 44.6% were married couples living together, 17.8% had a female householder with no husband present, and 35.6% were non-families. 28.7% of all households were made up of individuals, and 11.9% had someone living alone who was 65 years of age or older.  The average household size was 2.27 and the average family size was 2.82.

In the city, the population was spread out, with 19.2% under the age of 18, 10.0% from 18 to 24, 28.5% from 25 to 44, 26.8% from 45 to 64, and 15.5% who were 65 years of age or older.  The median age was 40 years. For every 100 females, there were 100.8 males.  For every 100 females age 18 and over, there were 103.2 males.

The median income for a household in the city was $41,932, and the median income for a family was $56,875. Males had a median income of $22,417 versus $38,056 for females. The per capita income for the city was $22,513.  About 4.1% of families and 7.9% of the population were below the poverty line, including 20.9% of those under the age of eighteen and 9.4% of those 65 or over.

Education

Oglethorpe County School District 
The Oglethorpe County School District holds pre-school to grade twelve, and consists of a primary school (preK-2), an elementary school (3-5), a middle school (6-8), and a high school (9-12). The district has 145 full-time teachers and over 2,281 students.
Oglethorpe County Elementary School
Oglethorpe County Primary School
Oglethorpe County Middle School
Oglethorpe County High School

Notable people
 Nathan Crawford Barnett, member of the Georgia House of Representatives and Georgia Secretary of State for more than 30 years. Raised in Lexington, and educated at the Lexington Academy
 Clifford Cleveland Brooks, planter and politician; member of the Louisiana State Senate from 1924 to 1932, born in Lexington in 1886 
 William Harris Crawford, lawyer and politician
 George Rockingham Gilmer, statesman and politician
 Joseph Henry Lumpkin, lawyer
 Wilson Lumpkin, lawyer and politician
 Stephen Upson, lawyer and politician

References

Cities in Georgia (U.S. state)
Cities in Oglethorpe County, Georgia
County seats in Georgia (U.S. state)
Athens – Clarke County metropolitan area